Michel Prost (born 23 February 1946) is a French former professional footballer who played as a forward. He is known for being one of the first "stars" in the history of Paris Saint-Germain. As of November 2022, Prost is a delegate for the town of Poissy in the Yvelines department of France.

Club career

Early career 
Prost was born in the town of Charenton-le-Pont, Île-de-France. In his teenage years, he played three different sports: football, rugby, and tennis. He was a youth footballer for Paris UC until 1966, when he joined Stade Saint-Germain. Then, he returned to Stade Saint-Germain.

Paris Saint-Germain 
In 1970, Stade Saint-Germain merged with Paris FC (PFC) to create Paris Saint-Germain (PSG). Therefore, Prost joined the newly-formed club. He would make his debut for PSG in a 1–1 draw against Poitiers on 23 August 1970, the first game in the club's history. His first goal for the Parisian club came in a 3–2 win over Quevilly six days later.

With PSG, Prost would lift the only title of his career, the Division 2 title, in 1971. He finished the season with 10 goals to his name in 32 league appearances, which made him the joint top-scorer for the club in the league. He would continue with the club for the following season in the Division 1. In the 1971–72 season, Prost scored 12 goals in 38 league appearances, as PSG managed to reach a safe 16th-place finish. However, in 1972, PSG split into two; PFC kept the first team players, stayed in the first division, but lost the club identity, while PSG was given the reserve team players, relegated to the Division 3, and kept the club identity. This meant that as a player with a professional contract, Prost now played for Paris FC. For Paris Saint-Germain, he had made 74 appearances and scored 22 goals in all competitions.

Paris FC, Nancy, and Bastia 
Prost played for Paris FC from 1972 to 1973. He would score 4 goals in 37 appearances for the club in all competitions before signing for Nancy. Eventually, he would only stay at Nancy for only six months, signing with Bastia in December 1973.

In the second half of 1976, Prost suffered an injury to his hip, and was told he could no longer play football at such a high level. He ended his professional career in October 1976, and left Bastia.

Red Star and Poissy 
After his injury, Prost went to play for Red Star in a semi-professional setting. He would formally retire from playing football in 1977. Soon after, his former Stade Saint-Germain manager Roger Quenolle invited him to become sporting director at Poissy, where he was coach. Prost accepted, but also worked for Chrysler on the side. He would also go on to play 4 games and score 1 goal for Poissy in the Division 2 in the 1977–78 season.

International career 
Prost played for several different national teams of France. He represented his country at amateur, military, and B level.

Personal life 
Michel has a son who is named Nicolas (born 1971/1972).

After his football career, Prost would go on to work for Peugeot-Citroën in Poissy. Later in his life, he would be a secretary at the Syndicat FO. In the 2010s decade, he would also become delegate in the town of Poissy. He helped organize the plans for Paris Saint-Germain's new training center in the town. He is still in his position of delegate as of November 2022.

In September 2021, Prost was invited to a Paris Saint-Germain match at the Parc des Princes by the club's president Nasser Al-Khelaifi. He received a jersey with his name on it from Al-Khelaifi.

Career statistics

Honours 
Paris Saint-Germain
 Division 2: 1970–71

References

External links 
 

1946 births
Living people
French footballers
People from Charenton-le-Pont
Association football forwards
Paris Université Club footballers
Stade Saint-Germain players
Paris Saint-Germain F.C. players
Paris FC players
AS Nancy Lorraine players
SC Bastia players
Red Star F.C. players
AS Poissy players
Ligue 2 players
Ligue 1 players
Championnat de France Amateur (1935–1971) players
France amateur international footballers
France B international footballers